The Genesee and Wyoming Railroad  was a flagship short-line railroad owned by Genesee & Wyoming Inc.

It was the first railroad in today's global G&W corporation "family" of shortlines all over the world. "G&W Orange", that began on the G&W railroad, can today be seen on railroads all over the world.

The Genesee and Wyoming Railroad was absorbed into the Rochester and Southern Railroad system in 2003, but still exists as a non-operating subsidiary of Genesee & Wyoming.

Genesee Street and Wyoming Street in the West Bottoms, the former site of the Kansas City Stockyards are named for the railroad.

References

New York (state) railroads
Railway companies established in 1899
Genesee & Wyoming
Non-operating common carrier freight railroads in the United States
1899 establishments in New York (state)